Dibasterium is an extinct genus of euchelicerate, a group of chelicerate arthropods. Fossils of the single and type species, D. durgae, have been discovered in the Coalbrookdale Formation of the Middle Silurian period (Homerian age) in Herefordshire, England (in the United Kingdom). The name of the genus is derived from the Latin words dibamos ("on two legs") and mysterium ("mystery"), meaning "mystery on two legs" and referring to its prosomal (of the head) limbs. The species name durgae comes from Durga, a Hindu goddess with many arms.

References

Euchelicerata
Fossils of England
Silurian arthropods of Europe
Silurian animals
Wenlock first appearances
Homerian extinctions
Fossil taxa described in 2012